The 1981 All-SEC football team consists of American football players selected to the All-Southeastern Conference (SEC) chosen by various selectors for the 1981 NCAA Division I-A football season. Alabama and Georgia shared the conference title.

Offensive selections

Receivers 

 Wamon Buggs, Vanderbilt (AP-1, UPI)
Lindsay Scott, Georgia (AP-1, UPI)
Orlando McDaniel, LSU (AP-2)
Anthony Hancock, Tennessee (AP-2)

Tight ends

Malcolm Scott, LSU (AP-1)
Bart Krout, Alabama (UPI)
Jerry Price, Miss. St. (AP-2)

Tackles 
Keith Uecker, Auburn (AP-1, UPI)
Bob Cayavec, Alabama (AP-2, UPI)
Pat Phenix, Ole Miss (AP-1)
Lole Hudgins, Vanderbilt (AP-2)

Guards
 Ken Hammond, Vanderbilt (AP-1, UPI)
Wayne Harris, Miss. St. (AP-1, UPI)
Jimmy Harper, Georgia (AP-2)
Doug Vickers, Alabama (AP-2)

Centers 
Lee North, Tennessee (AP-1, UPI)
Steve Mott, Alabama (AP-2)
Joe Happe, Georgia (AP-2)

Quarterbacks 

 Buck Belue, Georgia (AP-1, UPI)
 Whit Taylor, Vanderbilt (AP-2)

Running backs 

 Herschel Walker, Georgia (College Football Hall of Fame) (AP-1, UPI)
James Jones, Florida (AP-1, UPI)
Michael Haddix, Miss. St. (AP-2)
Ronnie Stewart, Georgia (AP-2)

Defensive selections

Ends 
Billy Jackson, Miss. St. (AP-1, UPI)
Mike Pitts, Alabama (AP-1)
Don Fielder, Kentucky (AP-2)
Steve Bearden, Vanderbilt (AP-2)

Tackles 
David Galloway, Florida (AP-1, UPI)
 Glen Collins, Miss. St. (AP-1, UPI)
 Jimmy Payne, Georgia (AP-1)
 Donnie Humphrey, Auburn (AP-2)
 Edmund Nelson, Auburn (AP-2)

Middle guards
Warren Lyles, Alabama (AP-1, UPI)
Eddie Weaver, Georgia (AP-2, UPI [as end])

Linebackers 
 Danny Skutack, Auburn (AP-1, UPI)
Johnie Cooks, Miss. St. (AP-1, UPI)
Tom Boyd, Alabama (AP-2, UPI)
 Wilber Marshall, Florida (AP-1)
 Albert Richardson, LSU (AP-2)
 Robbie Jones, Alabama (AP-2)
 Tommy Thurson, Georgia (AP-2)
 Fernando Jackson, Florida (AP-2)

Backs 
Tommy Wilcox, Alabama (AP-1, UPI)
Jeremiah Castille, Alabama (AP-1)
Andy Molls, Kentucky (AP-1)
Jim Bob Harris, Alabama (UPI)
Rob Fesmire, Miss. St. (UPI)
 Tyrone King, Alabama (UPI)
 Tony Lilly, Florida (AP-2)
 Bill Bates, Tennessee (AP-2)
 Bob Harris, Auburn (AP-2)

Special teams

Kicker 
Kevin Butler, Georgia (AP-2, UPI)
Brian Clark, Florida (AP-1)

Punter 

 Jim Arnold, Vanderbilt (AP-1, UPI)
 Jimmy Colquitt, Tennessee (AP-2)

Key
AP = Associated Press

UPI = United Press International

Bold = Consensus first-team selection by both AP and UPI

See also
1981 College Football All-America Team

References

All-SEC
All-SEC football teams